Jack Newby (born 20 November 1993) is a South African cricketer. He made his Twenty20 cricket debut for Western Province on 4 September 2015 in the 2015 Africa T20 Cup. He made his List A debut for Western Province in the 2017–18 CSA Provincial One-Day Challenge on 11 February 2018.

References

External links
 

1993 births
Living people
South African cricketers
Western Province cricketers
People from Islington (district)
Cricketers from Greater London